Daredevils of the Clouds  (aka Daredevils of the Sky) is a 1948 American drama film directed by George Blair and produced by Republic Pictures. The film stars Robert Livingston, Mae Clarke and James Cardwell. Daredevils of the Clouds depicts bush pilot flying in northern Canada.

Plot
Trans-Global Airlines president Douglas Harrison (Pierre Watkin) wants to force  Terry O'Rourke (Robert Livingston), and his rival Polar Airways out of business. Harrison connives Kay Cameron (Mae Clarke) to infiltrate O'Rourke's Edmonton, Alberta headquarters. Sgt. Dixon (Hugh Prosser) of the Canadian Air Patrol discovers she and Harrison's company pilot, Johnny Martin (James Cardwell), were involved in a scheme to ruin O'Rourke.

Cast

Production

Under the working title, Daredevils of the Sky, principal photography began in mid-February 1948 at the Republic Pictures Corp. studio and backlots, Los Angeles, California.

The Capelis XC-12 was featured as a prop,

Reception
Daredevils of the Clouds, was primarily a B film. Aviation film historian Stephen Pendo characterized the film as "tedious" with the flying scenes, "routine".

Actor-comedian Chris Elliott kept a vintage Daredevils of the Clouds poster in his office when he was a writer on Late Night with David Letterman. It appears as a prop decoration in his first two appearances as "The Guy Under The Seats" on "Late Night" in early 1984.

References

Notes

Citations

Bibliography

 Carlson, Mark. Flying on Film: A Century of Aviation in the Movies, 1912–2012. Duncan, Oklahoma: BearManor Media, 2012. .
 Farmer, James H. Celluloid Wings: The Impact of Movies on Aviation. Blue Ridge Summit, Pennsylvania: Tab Books Inc., 1984. .
 Hughes, Howard. When Eagles Dared: The Filmgoers' History of World War II. London: I. B. Tauris, 2012. .
 Pendo, Stephen. Aviation in the Cinema. Lanham, Maryland: Scarecrow Press, 1985. .
 Wynne, H. Hugh. The Motion Picture Stunt Pilots and Hollywood's Classic Aviation Movies. Missoula, Montana: Pictorial Histories Publishing Co., 1987. .

External links
 
 

American aviation films
1948 films
American action adventure films
1940s action adventure films
American black-and-white films
Films directed by George Blair
Films set in Canada
Republic Pictures films
1940s English-language films
1940s American films